Warren Wolf Jr. (born November 10, 1979) is an American jazz vibraphonist from Baltimore, Maryland.

Biography
Under the tutelage of his father, Warren Wolf Sr., Warren began his music studies at the age of three, learning the vibraphone, marimba, drums, and piano.  A classically trained musician, he attended the Peabody Institute's preparatory program for eight years.  He attended high school at the Baltimore School for the Arts, from which he graduated in 1997, and subsequently attended the Berklee College of Music, where he studied under jazz vibraphonist Dave Samuels for seven of eight semesters, the remaining semester being spent receiving instruction from vibraphonist Ed Saindon.  During his time at Berklee Wolf was an active member of Boston's jazz scene, playing the vibraphone, drums, and piano, and with his friend, trumpeter Jason Palmer he co-led a group at Wally's Cafe, the legendary Boston jazz venue, where he worked as house drummer.  He graduated from Berklee in 2001 and remained active on the Boston jazz scene as a local musician.  In September 2003 Wolf became an instructor in the percussion department at Berklee, giving private lessons on the vibraphone and drums, as well as teaching a beginners' keyboard class for entering freshmen majoring in drum performance.

Since leaving Berklee in 2005 for Baltimore, Wolf has been active on the international jazz scene, touring with Bobby Watson's "Live and Learn" Sextet, Karriem Riggins' "Virtuoso Experience", Donal Fox's Scarlatti Jazz Suite Project, Christian McBride & "Inside Straight", and with his own group of young musicians, "Wolfpack". His reputation as a gifted jazz lion is acknowledged by respected jazz critics such as the New York Times′s Ben Ratliff, who favorably reviewed Wolf's performance of November 16, 2011, at the 92nd Street Y's 92YTribeca venue, a performance that was featured by NPR with a 60-minute video on its website.

Wolf has made several recordings as a leader and a sideman. His recent effort, the eponymous Warren Wolf (2011), features Christian McBride on bass, Peter Martin on piano, Greg Hutchinson on drums, Tim Green on alto and soprano saxophones, and Jeremy Pelt on trumpet. In the New York Daily News on October 15, 2011, Greg Thomas wrote of the CD: "To say that Warren Wolf's Mack Avenue debut is auspicious would be an understatement. No doubt, this is one of the best of the year in jazz." Wolf's other notable recordings as a leader are Incredible Jazz Vibes (2005) (featuring Mulgrew Miller on piano, Vicente Archer on bass, and Kendrick Scott on drums), and Black Wolf (2009) (featuring Mulgrew Miller on piano, Rodney Whitaker on bass, and Jeff "Tain" Watts on drums).

Discography

As leader

As sideman
With Christian McBride
 Kind of Brown (Mack Avenue, 2009)
 People Music (Mack Avenue, 2013)
 Live at the Village Vanguard (Mack Avenue, 2021)

Compilations 
 It's Christmas on Mack Avenue (Mack Avenue, 2014)
 Live from the Detroit Jazz Festival, 2013 (Mack Avenue, 2014)

References

External links
Official Website
Mack Avenue Artist Page

American jazz vibraphonists
American jazz musicians
Berklee College of Music alumni
Peabody Institute alumni
Living people
1979 births
Musicians from Baltimore
African-American jazz musicians
Jazz musicians from Maryland
SFJAZZ Collective members
Mack Avenue Records artists
21st-century African-American people
20th-century African-American people